Caner is a Turkish masculine given name and a surname. People with the name include:

People

Given name
 Caner Ağca (born 1984), Turkish football player 
 Caner Cavlan (born 1992), Dutch football player 
 Caner Celep (born 1984), Turkish football player
 Caner Cindoruk (born 1980), Turkish actor 
 Caner Çolak (born 1991), Turkish football player
 Caner Dagli, American Islamic scholar
 Caner Erdeniz (born 1987), Turkish basketball player 
 Caner Erkin (born 1988), Turkish football player 
 Caner Koca (born 1996), Turkish football player
 Caner Osman (born 1991), Turkish-Macedonian basketball player
 Caner Osmanpaşa (born 1988), Turkish football player
 Caner Pekşen (born 1987), Turkish volleyball player
 Caner Taslaman (born 1968), Turkish academic
 Caner Topaloğlu (born 1985), Turkish basketball player
 Caner Topçu (born 1997), Turkish actor
 Caner Toptaş (born 2001), Turkish weightlifter

Middle name
 Yiğit Caner Aydın (born 1992), Turkish para archer

Surname
 Cevdet Caner (born 1973), Austrian entrepreneur
 Emir Caner (born 1970), Swedish-American academic
 Ergun Caner (born 1966), Swedish-American academic, author, and Baptist minister
 Federico Caner (born 1973), Italian politician 
 George Caner (1894–1984), American tennis player
 Nik Caner-Medley (born 1983), Azerbaijani-American basketball player

Turkish-language surnames
Turkish masculine given names